Polystictus is a genus of South American birds in the tyrant flycatcher family Tyrannidae commonly known as tachuris.

The genus contains the following two species:

References

 
Taxonomy articles created by Polbot
Taxa named by Ludwig Reichenbach